USS Dahlia was a paddle-wheel tugboat acquired by the Union Navy during the beginning of the American Civil War. Dahlia was assigned to the Mississippi River area to provide tug and other services to Union ships requiring assistance.

Built for the U.S. Army 

Firefly was built by the United States Army at St. Louis, Missouri in 1862; turned over to the Navy 1 October 1862; and named Dahlia 24 October 1862.

Civil War service 

Assigned to the Mississippi River Squadron under Rear Admiral David Dixon Porter. She provided tug services in the Mississippi River and its tributaries until 17 August 1865.

Post-war disposition 

Dahlia was sold at Mound City, Illinois in August 1865. She retained her name as a civilian ship after the war and passed out of service in about 1872.

References

External links 
 USS Dahlia (1862-1865). Originally named Firefly

Ships of the Union Navy
Ships built in St. Louis
Tugs of the United States Navy
Steamships of the United States Navy
American Civil War auxiliary ships of the United States
1862 ships